Asadullah Baloch is a Pakistani politician who is member-elect of the Provincial Assembly of the Balochistan.

On 8 September 2018, he was inducted into the provincial cabinet. On 9 September, he was made minister for Food and Social Welfare & Non-Formal Education.

References

Living people
Balochistan National Party (Awami) politicians
Politicians from Balochistan, Pakistan
Year of birth missing (living people)